Jean de Feu (born 23 December 1910, date of death unknown) was a Belgian wrestler. He competed in the men's Greco-Roman welterweight at the 1936 Summer Olympics.

References

1910 births
Year of death missing
Belgian male sport wrestlers
Olympic wrestlers of Belgium
Wrestlers at the 1936 Summer Olympics
Place of birth missing
20th-century Belgian people